Yinxu (modern) is the site of one of the ancient and major historical capitals of China. It is the source of the archeological discovery of oracle bones and oracle bone script, which resulted in the identification of the earliest known Chinese writing. The archeological remnants (or ruins) known as Yinxu represent the ancient city of Yin, the last capital of China's Shang dynasty which existed through eight generations for 255 years, and through the reign of 12 kings. Yinxu was discovered, or rediscovered, in 1899. It is now one of China's oldest and largest archeological sites, and was selected as a UNESCO World Heritage Site in 2006. Yinxu is located in northernmost Henan province near the modern city of Anyang, and near the Hebei and Shanxi province borders. Public access to the site is permitted.

Traditional history
According to the 2nd century Shuowen Jiezi dictionary (說文解字), the Chinese character "" (yīn) originally referred to "vibrant music-making". Although frequently used throughout written history to refer to both the Shang dynasty and its final capital, the name Yīn appears to have not been used in this way until the succeeding Zhou dynasty. In particular, the name does not appear in the oracle bones, which refer to the state as Shāng, and its final capital as Dàyì Shāng (大邑商 "Great Settlement Shang").

Among surviving ancient Chinese historical documents, Yin is described as the final capital of the Shang dynasty. There is some disagreement, though, as to when the move to Yin took place. Both the Book of Documents, (specifically, the "Pan Geng" chapter, which is believed to date from the late Spring and Autumn period), and the Bamboo Annals state that Shang king Pan Geng moved the Shang capital to Yin. The Bamboo Annals state, more specifically, that during his reign Pan Geng moved the capital from Yān (奄; present-day Qufu, in present-day Shandong Province), to a site called Běimĕng, where it was then renamed to Yīn. (Conversely, according to the Records of the Grand Historian of Sima Qian, Pan Geng moved the Shang capital from a location north of the Yellow River to Bo , the capital of Shang dynasty founder Tang, on the south side of the river—a location inconsistent with the location of Yin.)

Regardless, Yin was clearly established as the Shang capital by the time of Shang king Wu Ding. Wu Ding launched numerous military campaigns from this base against surrounding tribes, thus securing Shang rule and raising the dynasty to its historical zenith.

According to the traditional accounts, later rulers became pleasure-seekers who took no interest in state affairs. King Zhòu, the last of the Shang dynasty kings, is particularly remembered for his ruthlessness and debauchery. His increasingly autocratic laws alienated the nobility until King Wu of the Zhou dynasty was able to gain the support to rise up and overthrow the Shang.

The Zhou dynasty established their capital at Fenghao near modern-day Xi'an, and Yīn was abandoned to fall into ruin. These ruins were mentioned by Sima Qian in his Records of the Grand Historian, and described in some detail by Li Daoyuan in his Commentary to the River Classic, published during the Southern and Northern Dynasties period (420-589 CE). Thereafter, the once-great city of Yīn was relegated to legend along with its founding dynasty until its rediscovery in the final years of the Qing dynasty.

Archaeological discoveries

Yinxu is well known for its oracle bones, which were first recognized as containing ancient Chinese writing in 1899 by Wang Yirong, director of the Imperial Academy. One account of Wang's discovery was that he was suffering from malaria at the time and was prescribed Longgu (龍骨) (dragon bones) at a traditional Chinese pharmacy. He noticed strange carvings on these bones and concluded that these could be samples of an ancient form of Chinese writing.

News of the discovery of the oracle bones created a market for them among antiques collectors, and led to multiple waves of illegal digs over several decades, with tens of thousands of pieces taken. The source of the "dragon bones" was eventually traced to the small village of Xiaotun, just outside Anyang. In 1910, noted scholar Luo Zhenyu affirmed that the area was the site of the last Shang dynasty capital. Canadian missionary and oracle bone analyst James Menzies also independently identified Anyang as the capital in 1910. In 1917, Wang Guowei deciphered the oracle bone inscriptions of the names of the Shang kings and constructed a complete Shang genealogy. This closely matched that in the Records of the Grand Historian by Sima Qian, confirming the historical authenticity of the legendary Shang dynasty and the archaeological importance of Yinxu.
However, the oracle bone inscriptions record the name of the state as Dàyìshāng or Shāngyì.

The first official archeological excavations at Yinxu were led by the archeologist Li Ji of the Institute of History and Philosophy from 1928-37. They uncovered the remains of a royal palace, several royal tombs, and more than 100,000 oracle bones that show the Shang had a well-structured script with a complete system of written signs.

Since 1950 ongoing excavations by the Institute of Archaeology, Chinese Academy of Social Sciences have uncovered evidence of stratification at the Hougang site, remains of palaces and temples, royal cemeteries, oracle bone inscriptions, bronze and bone workshops and the discovery of the Huanbei site on the north bank of the Huan River. One of the largest and oldest sites of Chinese archaeology, excavations here have laid the foundation for work across the country.

Four periods are recognized at the site.
They correlate approximately with oracle bone periods assigned by Dong Zuobin, royal reigns and dates assigned by the Xia–Shang–Zhou Chronology Project as follows:

Excavation sites
At 30 km² this is the largest archaeological site in China and excavations have uncovered over 80 rammed-earth foundation sites including palaces, shrines, tombs and workshops. From these remains archaeologists have been able to confirm that this was the spiritual and cultural center of the Shang dynasty.

The best preserved of the Shang dynasty royal tombs unearthed at Yinxu is the Tomb of Fu Hao. The extraordinary Lady Hao was a military leader and the wife of Shang King Wu Ding. The tomb was discovered in 1976 by Zheng Zhenxiang and has been dated to 1250 BCE. It was completely undisturbed, having escaped the looting that had damaged the other tombs on the site, and in addition to the remains of the Queen the tomb was discovered to contain 6 dog skeletons, 16 human slave skeletons, and numerous grave goods of huge archaeological value. The tomb was thoroughly excavated and extensively restored and is now open to the public.

Also located on site is the Exhibition Hall of Chariot Pits where the earliest samples of animal-driven carts discovered by Chinese archaeology are on display. These artifacts were excavated by the Anyang Working Station of the Archaeological Institute of the Chinese Social Science Academy and the Historical Relics Working Team of Anyang Municipality in the northern and southern lands of Liujiazhuang village and the eastern land of Xiaomintun village and put on display within the hall. The six pits each contain the remains of a carriage and two horses. Five of the pits were also found to contain the remains of a human sacrifice (four adult males and one child). Also on display are the remains of an 8.35 meter wide Shang dynasty road discovered at Anyang Aero Sports School in 2000.

Historical value

The Yinxu, as the capital site of the Shang Dynasty discovered in China with exact written records, are of great value to the study of the history of the Shang Dynasty. Before the excavation of Yinxu, the history of Chinese written records began in the first year of the Western Zhou Dynasty, but with the discovery of oracle bone inscriptions at Yinxu and the excavation of Yinxu, the existence of the Shang Dynasty in China was confirmed, and the framework of early ancient Chinese history was reconstructed, making it possible to assess the credibility of traditional documents used to record the history of the Shang Dynasty.

Among the 150,000 oracle bones unearthed at the Yinxu, the earliest evidence of the current Chinese writing system was found. Yinxu cultural relics represented by bronze ware and jade ware and Yinxu funeral customs represented by human sacrifice, human sacrifice, chariot and horse sacrifice, animal sacrifice, etc., provide unique evidence for the cultural tradition of the late Shang Dynasty.

As the ruins of the late Shang capital city, Yinxu have discovered a large number of handicraft workshops and a large number of handicrafts. The patterns on all kinds of utensils show the high artistic level of the Shang Dynasty, especially the patterns on the bronze ware, from the animal face pattern to the whorl pattern to the Taotie(饕餮) pattern, all show an artistic style at that time, it provides important materials for us to understand the artistic development and aesthetic status of the Shang Dynasty. The large-scale bronze wares excavated at the site, such as the Simuwu Ding, etc., cast by section-mold process in an elaborate manner, have great significance in Chinese history of metallurgy.

The oracle bone inscriptions and bronze wares unearthed in Yinxu prove that Anyang was a Bronze Age society. This society has both writing and metallurgy, which are the two most obvious indicators of a civilization.

In terms of urban layout and architecture, the ring-shaped and open urban layout of Yin Ruins has a great impact on the later capital buildings; it also uses rivers for flood control, and uses beams to support bricks and woods in architecture. Architecture and the formation of traditional Chinese architecture bring a lot of inspiration.

Genetic studies
A study of mitochondrial DNA (inherited in the maternal line) from Yinxu graves showed similarity with modern northern Han Chinese, but significant differences from southern Han Chinese.

See also
 Historical capitals of China
 Huanbei

References 
Citations

Works cited

External links
 UNESCO World Heritage Center - Yinxu Listing

Archaeological sites in China
Ancient Chinese capitals
Archaeological museums in China
Chinese architectural history
Cities in Henan
Major National Historical and Cultural Sites in Henan
Museums in Henan
National archaeological parks of China
Ruins in China
Shang dynasty
World Heritage Sites in China
Yinxu